La Serna is a municipality located in the province of Palencia, Castile and León, Spain.

References

Municipalities in the Province of Palencia